Jason Stephens may refer to:

 Jason Stephens (television producer), Australian actor and comedian
 Jason Stephens (film producer) (born 1975)
 Jason Stephens (politician), Ohio state representative

See also
 Jason Stevens (born 1973), former rugby league footballer
 Jay Stephens (born 1971), Canadian cartoonist